Muhammad Youssef (born 10 January 1938, date of death unknown) was a Pakistani long-distance runner. He competed in the marathon at the 1964 Summer Olympics.

References

External links
 

1938 births
Year of death missing
Athletes (track and field) at the 1964 Summer Olympics
Pakistani male long-distance runners
Pakistani male marathon runners
Olympic athletes of Pakistan
Place of birth missing
Asian Games medalists in athletics (track and field)
Asian Games silver medalists for Pakistan
Athletes (track and field) at the 1962 Asian Games
Medalists at the 1962 Asian Games
20th-century Pakistani people